Khaya anthotheca, with the common name East African mahogany, is a large tree species in the Meliaceae family, native to tropical Africa.

The name anthotheca was taken from the Greek word anthos, meaning flower, while theca refers to a capsule. It is known by a number of other common names, including Nyasaland, red or white mahogany. Oos-Afrikaanse mahonie is the Afrikaans name and acajou is its name in French.

Distribution
It is widespread, occurring from Guinea Bissau east to Uganda and Tanzania, and south to Angola, Zambia, Zimbabwe and Mozambique. It is fairly widely grown in plantations within its natural area of distribution, but also in South Africa, tropical Asia and tropical America. It is easily confused with other Khaya species like K. grandifoliola, K. senegalensis or  K. ivorensis in the north of its natural range.

Habitat
The East African mahogany grows in medium to low altitude areas in evergreen forests. They require damp lands in order to grow. The Big Tree in Chirinda Forest is the tallest native tree in Zimbabwe.

Description
They have greyish-brown bark.

On mature trees, white scented flowers are borne at the ends of the branches.

Common uses
It is used for furniture, flooring, paneling and boat building and for musical instrument (e.g. guitar). It is a very suitable tree for these projects because the bark weathers well, is resistant to borers and termites, besides fungal decay, and is tough but saws well. The bark has a bitter taste which is often used as a medicine for common colds. The oil from the seeds can also be rubbed into a person's scalp to rid of insects and lice.

Threats
It is often cut down and destroyed in East and West Africa. Planting new trees in these areas to make up for what was destroyed is very rare. Genetic erosion is thought to have occurred as well. Because of this, the species is listed as "vulnerable" on the IUCN Red List. Some of its populations have been offered protection, and some countries placed bans on its export. The foliage is eaten by the larvae of the moth Heteronygmia dissimilis.

References

Alec Naidoo Pretoria. National Botanical Garden. September 2007.  Downloaded October 17, 2012.
Forestry Department.  Downloaded October 18, 2012.
Mpingo Conservation and Development Initiative.  Downloaded October 20, 2012.

External links

 

anthotheca
Trees of Africa
Flora of East Tropical Africa
Flora of South Tropical Africa
Flora of West-Central Tropical Africa
Flora of Guinea-Bissau
Flora of Uganda
Flora of Tanzania
Flora of Angola
Flora of Zambia
Flora of Zimbabwe
Flora of Mozambique
Plants used in traditional African medicine
Vulnerable flora of Africa
Taxonomy articles created by Polbot